Bull Lake is a lake in Thunder Bay District, Ontario, Canada. The primary outflow is an unnamed creek to a point on the Whitesand River, between Hornblende Lake upstream and Lyne Lake downstream.

References

Lakes of Thunder Bay District